The California exodus is an alleged mass emigration of residents and businesses from California to other U.S. states, especially Texas and Florida. The cause and existence of this migration have been extensively debated. The term became popular during the COVID-19 pandemic. Some have disputed the existence of a California exodus, criticizing it as a narrative.

Demographics

California became part of the United States after the Mexican–American War. Like much of the land taken from Mexico in the war, California had only a small non-Native population.  However, the California Gold Rush led to a population boom, during which California gained statehood in 1850. In the period between the 1850 and 1860 censuses, the state population more than quadrupled. It saw a second period of growth in the years after World War II because of the aerospace and defense industries, and a third during the 1980s and early 1990s because of the Silicon Valley tech industry. Population growth slowed in the mid-1990s as the federal government cut aerospace spending after the end of the Cold War, and again after the Great Recession.

According to the California Department of Finance, the state had 135,600 more people move out than moved in from July 1, 2019, to July 1, 2020, marking the third straight year of net migration losses. After peaking just shy of 40 million Californians, by 2020 into 2022 onward this slowing had crossed the ZPG mark into outright negative population growth for the first time in over a century.

The state has had a net loss of domestic migrants every year since about 1989, and in the period from 2015 to 2019 it had a net loss of at least 100,000 domestic migrants per year due to more Californians moving to other states than vice versa. According to Census Bureau estimates, 6,185,000 people left the state in the 2010s decade, while 4,934,000 moved in—for a net loss of 1,251,000 residents.

The change is visible in state-to-state migration flows. In 1955–1960, the ten largest state-to-state migration flows involving California all had the state as a recipient of people. This is contrasted with the period 1995–2000, where nine of the ten largest flows involving the state had California as a net loser, with only New York sending more people to California than it received in return.

In 2021, more than 360,000 people left California, especially going to states like Texas, Arizona and Washington. Some are even moving to Mexico to avoid the 2021–2022 inflation surge, as Mexico is more affordable to live in than the United States.

Between April 2020 and July 2022, the state's population dropped by more than 500,000 people.

Businesses that have left California

Several businesses, particularly Silicon Valley companies, have moved their headquarters out of California in recent years. Though they have moved to a variety of other states, Texas has received many of the new headquarters, including those of Hewlett Packard Enterprise and Oracle. Businessman Elon Musk moved from California to Texas in late 2020, though his companies SpaceX and Tesla remained in California. Tesla has since relocated to Austin, Texas. Jeremy Boreing and Ben Shapiro, in September 2020, moved their company The Daily Wire to Nashville away from California. They cited California’s drug and crime problem and California’s left-wing politics as their primary reasons for departure.

Cited causes

A variety of causes have been given for the California Exodus, many of them relating to cost of living. Kenneth P. Miller of The San Bernardino Sun said in 2022 that taxes, as well as rising costs on housing, food, and other needs and wants, are the biggest reason for Californians leaving the state. According to the Los Angeles Times, housing cost is the primary reason, followed by long commutes, crime and pollution.

Housing and infrastructure 
California has repeatedly been ranked as one of the country’s most expensive states to live in. The median asking price for a house is $797,470 in California, which only a quarter of households in the state can afford.

Economists have cited restrictive zoning policies and lack of investment in transportation infrastructure that has resulted in sprawl, constrained housing supply, high housing prices, and severe congestion. They also cited over-reliance on sales tax, fees, and disproportionate property taxes on new residents caused by 1978 California Proposition 13.

Criticism of exodus as a narrative

The California Exodus has been criticized as a narrative.

In a December 2020 column for the Los Angeles Times, journalist Michael Hiltzik argues that California's slowing population growth is a cause for concern but not indicative of a full-blown crisis. Hiltzik quoted demographer Hank Johnson from the Public Policy Institute of California as saying that recent data "is just an incremental change from what we've been seeing over a couple of decades." According to Johnson, California's population trends don't compare to the "hollowing-out" of Rust Belt cities such as Cleveland, Detroit, and St. Louis, which have lost more than half their populations in the last 50 years. Hiltzik instead says that a lack of affordable housing is California's main problem, as it has pushed young people out of the state, and that concerns about over-regulation are being exaggerated.

Researchers from several universities, including the University of California, Berkeley, the University of California, Los Angeles (UCLA), Cornell University, and Stanford University, started studying California's population in the fall of 2020. In July 2021, the researchers published their findings, which found "no evidence of an abnormal increase in residents planning to move out of the state."

See also

California Dream
California–Texas rivalry
Demographics of California
Depopulation of the Great Plains
Go West, young man
History of California (1900–present)
Internal migration
List of U.S. states and territories by net migration#Net domestic migration
Sun Belt
White flight

References 

2020s in California
American political neologisms
Demographics of California
Economic history of California
Internal migrations in the United States